Baileys Harbor is an unincorporated census-designated place in Door County, within the town of Baileys Harbor, Wisconsin, United States. The community is located on Wisconsin Highway 57 northeast of Jacksonport. As of the 2010 census, its population was 257.

History
It was the first established village on the Door Peninsula and was named after Captain Justice Bailey, who while seeking refuge from a violent storm on Lake Michigan found sanctuary in the sheltered harbor in 1848.

Gallery

References

Census-designated places in Wisconsin
Census-designated places in Door County, Wisconsin